The County of Artois was a historic province of the Kingdom of France, held by the Dukes of Burgundy from 1384 until 1477/82, and a state of the Holy Roman Empire from 1493 until 1659.

Present Artois lies in northern France, on the border with Belgium.  Its territory has an area of around 4000 km² and a population of about one million. Its principal cities are Arras (Atrecht), Calais (Kales), Boulogne-sur-Mer (Bonen), Saint-Omer (Sint-Omaars), Lens and Béthune. It forms the interior of the French département Pas-de-Calais.

Originally a feudal county itself, Artois was annexed by the county of Flanders. It came to France in 1180 as a dowry of a Flemish princess, Isabelle of Hainaut, and was again made a separate county in 1237 for Robert, a grandson of Isabelle. Through inheritance, Artois came under the rule of the dukes of Burgundy in 1384. At the death of the fourth duke, Charles the Bold, Artois was inherited by the Habsburgs and passed to the dynasty's Spanish line. After the religious revolts of 1566 in the Netherlands, Artois briefly entered the Dutch Revolt in 1576, participating in the Pacification of Ghent until it formed the Union of Arras in 1579.

After the Union, Artois and Hainaut (Dutch: Henegouwen) reached a separate agreement with Philip II of Spain. Artois remained with the Spanish Netherlands until it was conquered by the French during the Thirty Years War. The annexation was acknowledged during the Treaty of the Pyrenees in 1659, and it became a French province. Artois had already been largely French-speaking, but it was part of the Southern Netherlands until the French annexation.

Location
Artois occupies the interior of the Pas-de-Calais département, the western part of which constitutes the former Boulonnais. Artois roughly corresponds to the arrondissements of Arras, Béthune, Saint Omer, and Lens, and the eastern part of the arrondissement of Montreuil. It occupies the western end of the coalfield which stretches eastward through the neighbouring Nord département and across central Belgium.

History

At the time of Julius Caesar, Artois was the country of the Atrebates, one of the tribes he referred to as Belgae. Their capital, Nemetocenna (later also called Nemetacum or Nemetacon too, all believed to have originated from the Celtic word nemeton, meaning 'sacred space'), is now the city of Arras, which possibly took its later name from the old name of the region. Under the Roman empire the region became a civitas within the Roman province of Belgica. 

As Roman power waned, the civitas continued to exist as the original basis of the christian Diocese of Arras. Under the Franks the region became a Carolingian jurisdiction (comitatus) within West Francia. A lordship was established by the counts Odalric and Ecfrid of Artois; its territories from 898 on were integrated into the County of Flanders by Count Baldwin II, completed by his son and successor Count Arnulf I.

A new territorial principality of Artois was established in 1180 by the division of the county of Flanders as a dowry given by the Flemish count Philip of Alsace to his niece Isabelle of Hainaut at the time of her marriage to King Philip II of France. Upon Isabelle's death in 1190, it was claimed as a reverted fief by the French crown, which, however, met with strong opposition by Flanders. The French crown prince Louis VIII the Lion, who had inherited the title of Count of Artois from his mother Isabelle, campaigned in Flemish lands and captured Count Ferrand at the Battle of Bouvines in 1214, thereby acquiring the county for the French House of Capet, which was confirmed by the 1226 Treaty of Melun.

In 1237, King Louis VIII gave the County of Artois as an appanage to his younger son Robert, who thereby became the progenitor of the House of Artois, a cadet branch of the Capetian dynasty. After the death of his heir Count Robert II at the Battle of the Golden Spurs in 1302, a succession dispute arose between Robert's daughter, Countess Mahaut and her nephew Robert III, who represented the claim of his father Philip, who had died after the Battle of Furnes in 1298. The dispute was settled in favour of Mahaut. Upon her death in 1329, Artois passed to her daughter by the Anscarid count Otto IV of Burgundy, Countess Joan II. Joan II had inherited the County of Burgundy (Franche-Comté) in 1315 and when she died in 1330, she bequested Artois and Franche-Comté to her eldest daughter, Joan III.

Joan III, Countess of Artois and Burgundy, entered into the dynastic allegiance with the ducal House of Burgundy, a cadet branch of the royal Capetians, by marrying Odo IV of Burgundy in 1330. Until 1350 all territories of Artois, Franche-Comté and the Burgundian duchy were inherited by their grandson Philip I of Burgundy. Upon Philip's death in 1361, however, Artois reverted to the second daughter of Joan, Margaret, and after her death once again to Flanders, which was now itself ruled by her son, Count Louis II in 1382. In 1384 all Flanders, Artois and Franche-Comté finally became part of the vast, complex territory of the Duchy of Burgundy, as Louis' daughter and heiress Margaret III had married Duke Philip the Bold in 1369.

Artois was then held by Philip's descendants from the Burgundian House of Valois-Burgundy until the extinction of the line with the death of Duke Charles the Bold at the Battle of Nancy on 5 January 1477. Seized by King Louis XI of France, he at first established the county as a seneschalate. Nevertheless, the Burgundian territories were also claimed by Archduke Maximilian I of Habsburg, the son of Emperor Frederick III and husband of Charles' daughter Mary the Rich. Maximilian's and Louis' troops met at the 1479 Battle of Guinegate. The Habsburg forces were victorious; however, Mary died in 1482 and Maximilian was only able to retain Flanders, while Artois and Franche-Comté were officially ceded to the French king by the Treaty of Arras in 1482.

Louis' successor King Charles VIII of France nevertheless ceded both territories to Maximilian, now Holy Roman Emperor by the 1493 Treaty of Senlis. Then a state of the Holy Roman Empire, Artois as one of the Seventeen Provinces of the Habsburg Netherlands from 1512 on belonged to the Burgundian Circle and from 1556 was held by Habsburg Spain. In 1579 Artois together with Hainaut and Walloon Flanders signed the Union of Arras loyal to the Spanish Habsburgs, while in reaction the seven northern provinces of the Spanish Netherlands formed the Union of Utrecht, the precursor of the Dutch Republic. Artois in the course of the Franco-Spanish War was conquered by the troops of King Louis XIII of France in 1640 and reverted to French rule by the 1659 Treaty of the Pyrenees.

The title of Count of Artois was used only once more, for Charles-Philippe (1757–1836), grandson of King Louis XV, until he ascended as king in 1824.

References

Bibliography

External links 
 

 
1237 establishments in Europe
1230s establishments in France
1659 disestablishments in the Holy Roman Empire
Artois
History of the Pas-de-Calais
Artois
States and territories established in the 9th century
1380s in the Burgundian Netherlands
Subdivisions of the Pas-de-Calais
Former counties of France
Artois